Alyaksandr Novik (born 25 July 1975) is a retired Belarusian footballer. He spent all his professional career at Shakhtyor Soligorsk from 1993 until 2009.

Honours
Shakhtyor Soligorsk
Belarusian Premier League champion: 2005
Belarusian Cup winner: 2003–04

External links
Profile at KLISF
Player profile on official site
Profile at teams.by

1975 births
Living people
Belarusian footballers
Belarusian Premier League players
FC Shakhtyor Soligorsk players
Association football midfielders